The Alfa Romeo 2uettottanta is a 2010 Pininfarina concept car and a tribute to mark the 80th anniversary of Pininfarina and the centenary of Alfa Romeo. It is also a tribute to the Duetto Spider.

Context
The 2uettottanta concept is Pininfarina's vision for how a next-generation Alfa spider should look. The 2uettottanta represents the culmination of the long-standing partnership between the two Italian firms, and pays tribute to the iconic 60s-era Duetto roadster. The 2 in the name refers to its two-seater configuration, "2uetto" to the influence of Alfa's classic Duetto model, and ottanta – 80 in Italian – to the number of years since Pininfarina was founded.
It was made to be a celebratory car aiming to replicate the "passion" of the two brands.
The way the name is spelled often leads to confusion. The first character is not a 2, as is often presumed, but a capital manuscript D as it was written in the Renaissance.

Style
The 2uettottanta's red bodywork was inspired by the typical Alfa Romeo paintwork. The car features design cues from the Alfa Romeo Duetto and has Alfa Romeo's traditional feature of a triangle with the Alfa Romeo emblem on the front. The bodywork features soft curves with a central line at the front end. To the sides of the Alfa Romeo emblem, there are two triangular air inlets. The headlights, which used the latest LED technologies, are set under the car's main body line. A carbon band in the lower part of the front end acts as a splitter and directs airflow towards the rear. The back is characterized by two bumps which create the roll-bars at the back of the seats. The interior is spacious and comfortable with form-fitting sports seats. The interior also features a retro-styled three-spoke steering wheel. The driving position is low to the ground and the seatback is steeply raked. The major controls are placed around the steering column and on the central tunnel, as well as across the upper dash. The detailing includes glowing white Alfa Romeo badges on the centre of the speedometer and rev counter needles. The gear shifter is finished in machined aluminum billet.

Technical information
The car is equipped with a longitudinally mounted, turbocharged 1750 cc four-cylinder engine, a tribute to the 1750 Veloce from 1968, one of many versions derived from the famous "Osso di Seppia" (Cuttlefish). Power is delivered to the rear wheels through a TCT box.

References

External links

Alfa Romeo 2uettottanta
The spider Pininfarina 2uettottanta by AlfaDuetto.it
netcarshow.com - 2uettottanta

2uettottanta
Pininfarina